"I Love the Sound of Breaking Glass" is a song written by Nick Lowe, Andrew Bodnar, and Steve Goulding and performed by Lowe. It reached number 7 on the UK Singles in 1978. The song was featured on his 1978 album, Jesus of Cool.

The song was produced by Lowe. It shared a title with the David Bowie song "Breaking Glass"; Lowe commented, "This sounds so unlike me, but I wasn't aware he had a song called 'Breaking Glass.' ... But Bowie was the guy who had that title first of all. I think the music on my 'Breaking Glass' has something to do with him. I think I pinched something off of him in the music."

Lowe reflected on the song in an interview with GQ in 2011, saying that he did not perform the song live as it could not be effectively performed solo. He explained, "There's one song of mine called 'I Love the Sound of Breaking Glass,' which was a fairly big hit in Europe, and people ask me for that sometimes, and I just don't do it. It's a really good record, but there's not actually any song there. It was a half-baked idea I had when I went to the studio, and the bass player and drummer sort of put a little sauce in it. But if I played it with just an acoustic guitar, the audience would probably give me a little clap in recognition, but by verse two, they'd be looking at their fingernails, waiting for the next one. There really isn't anything to it."

When Lowe filmed a performance of "I Love the Sound of Breaking Glass" for Top of the Pops in 1978, he brought his future wife Carlene Carter to the set as part of their first date. Carter recalled, "I went to see him at Top of the Pops. He was doing 'I Love the Sound of Breaking Glass' in his Riddler suit, covered with question marks. We had chemistry."

Cover versions
Luke Haines released a version of the song on his 2001 album, Christie Malry's Own Double Entry OST.

References

1978 songs
1978 singles
Songs written by Nick Lowe
Nick Lowe songs
Song recordings produced by Nick Lowe
Radar Records singles